The following page lists all of the power stations operating in the Republic of Ireland.

Power plants 
The table below gives a detailed overview of the fossil-fuel based power plants operating in Ireland in 2017. The data is publicly available and updated annually by the Irish Transmission System Operator (TSO), EirGrid, in its Generation Adequacy Report. In total there was 6609 MW of power plants available in 2017.

[1] To be shut by 2023
[2] To be shut by 2022
[3] Planning permission extended to end 2023
[4] PSO levy runs out in 2019

Renewable

Non-Dispatchable plants 
This table outlines the type and capacity of non-dispatchable renewable energy generation in Ireland, which was over 3 GW in 2015. In 2010 it was 1223 MW. The vast majority of it is generated by Irish wind farms.

Hydroelectric

Former power stations 
New power stations were commissioned in the 1950s to meet the increasing demand for electricity. These included the following.

See also 

 East-West Interconnector
 List of power stations in Europe
 List of largest power stations in the world
 Pumped-storage hydroelectricity

References 

Ireland
Power stations